Joanne Chang (born in Houston, Texas) is an American chef and restaurant owner. She is the owner of Flour Bakery in Boston and Cambridge, Massachusetts and James Beard Foundation Award winner for Outstanding Baker, 2016.  In announcing the award, Devra First of the Boston Globe wrote that Chang was "on her way to becoming the Susan Lucci of the Beards."  She is known for her sticky buns. In 2021, Chang appeared as a judge on Netflix's Baking Impossible.

Early life and education
Chang's parents were immigrants who met while studying in Houston. She was born in Houston circa 1971. As a child, she grew up in Oklahoma and Texas and enjoyed cooking and baking. Her family consumed a diet of "traditional Chinese cuisine at home" and preferred to avoid sugary sweets. However, she enjoyed baking chocolate chip cookies with her mother. Chang was the valedictorian of her high school class.

Chang is an honors graduate of Harvard College, Class of 1991, with a degree in applied mathematics and economics. While studying at Harvard, she initially studied astrophysics before switching to applied mathematics. In college, she began selling chocolate chip cookies for the dormitory grill and became known as the "Chocolate Chip Cookie Girl".

Early career
After graduation, Chang worked as a  management consultant  at the Monitor Group in Cambridge. While working at the company, she created a business plan for a company called Joanne's Kitchen and prepared cakes and cookies for her co-workers. After two years of working there, Chang realized that consulting was not the best career for her. Instead of applying to an MBA program or moving up the corporate ladder, she took a year off and applied for work as a chef, despite having limited culinary experience.

Chang began her professional cooking career as a garde-manger cook at Boston's Biba restaurant (she was initially hired to run the bar-food program but was soon promoted by Lydia Shire to making appetizers and salads), followed by stints as the pastry cook at Bentonwood Bakery in Newton, and in 1995, the pastry chef at Rialto restaurant in Cambridge.  In 1997, she began working at the cake department of Payard Patisserie in New York City, following a schedule of working from "4 a.m. to midnight, six days a week." Returning to Boston a year later with dreams of opening up her own pastry shop, she brought her French and American training to Mistral where she was the pastry chef until summer of 2000.

In 2007, Chang appeared on Food Network Throwdown! with Bobby Flay and became "nationally known" for beating him. In 2015, she created a frozen yogurt flavor for Pinkberry.

Restaurants 
As of 2020, there are 10 Flour Bakery locations across Massachusetts with over 200 employees.  Flour promotes the idea of "fresh, handmade bakery foods" and employees are taught to treat products with "Pastry Love". Honored for its signature sticky buns, Flour is about the experience a customer has when they come through the door. Joanne differentiates flour and Starbucks as one being an "experience" and the other as a "convenience".  Flour, as its name indicates, seeks to provide a simple pleasurable experience for their customers. Quoted in flour's mission: "we focus on all aspects involved: great food, gracious service, warm atmosphere, heady aromas, and irresistible displays". Chang hopes that every customer "comes in and leaves happier".

In 2007, Chang and her husband, Christopher Myers, opened Myers + Chang, an Asian fusion restaurant in Boston's South End. The pair created Myers + Chang because, as Chang put it, "Boston needed a restaurant like what we knew we could create: Asian inspired, warm spirited service, genuine hospitality, stylish and fun, a place where everyone would relax and have a great meal".

Awards 
James Beard Foundation Awards

2016 Outstanding Baker

2018 Outstanding Chef 2018 Semifinalist

Cookbooks
Flour: Spectacular Recipes from Boston's Flour Bakery + Cafe
Flour Too: Indispensable Recipes for the Café's Most Loved Sweets & Savories
Baking with Less Sugar: Recipes for Dessert using Natural Sweeteners and Little-to-No White Sugar
Myers+Chang at Home

Personal life
Chang met her husband Christopher Myers (restaurateur) in 1995 while they worked together at Rialto, Cambridge Boston. Together, they opened Myers + Chang in 2007, which was "inspired in Chinese and South Asian street food, in the South End", and co-own the restaurant. She ran every Boston Marathon between 1991 and 2006. Chang is a supporter of the No Kid Hungry organization, which seeks to eradicate childhood hunger, and the Family Reach organization.

References

External links 

 Myers+Chang
 Flour Bakery

Harvard College alumni
Restaurant founders
American women restaurateurs
American restaurateurs
Businesspeople from Houston
Businesspeople from Boston
American people of Taiwanese descent
Chefs from Massachusetts
American women chefs
Living people
James Beard Foundation Award winners
1971 births
21st-century American women